Ơ (lowercase ơ) is one of the 12 Vietnamese language vowels. It is pronounced  (an unrounded [o]).

As with most special Vietnamese letters, this letter is not well-supported by fonts and is often typed as either o+ or o*. The VIQR standard is o+.

On the Windows default Vietnamese keyboard Ơ can be found on where the ] key is on a US English keyboard layout.

Because Vietnamese is a tonal language this letter may optionally have any one of the five tonal symbols above or below it.
Ờ ờ
Ớ ớ
Ở ở
Ỡ ỡ
Ợ ợ

Character mappings

References

See also
 Ư
 Horn (diacritic)
 O͘
 Vietnamese alphabet

Vietnamese language
Latin letters with diacritics
Vowel letters
Vietnamese alphabets